Other specified dissociative disorder (OSDD) is a mental health diagnosis for pathological dissociation that matches the DSM-5 criteria for a dissociative disorder, but does not fit the full criteria for any of the specifically identified subtypes, which include dissociative identity disorder, dissociative amnesia, and depersonalization/derealization disorder, and the reasons why the previous diagnoses were not met are specified. "Unspecified dissociative disorder" is given when the clinician does not give a reason. The International Statistical Classification of Diseases and Related Health Problems (ICD-10) refers to the diagnosis as "Other dissociative and conversion disorders". Under the fourth edition of the Diagnostic and Statistical Manual of Mental Disorders (DSM), it was known as "Dissociative disorder not otherwise specified" (DDNOS).

Examples of OSDD include chronic and recurrent syndromes of mixed dissociative symptoms, identity disturbance due to prolonged and intense coercive persuasion, disorders similar to dissociative identity disorder, acute dissociative reactions to stressful events, and dissociative trance.

OSDD is the most common dissociative disorder and is diagnosed in 40% of dissociative disorder cases. It is often co-morbid with other mental illnesses such as complex posttraumatic stress disorder, major depressive disorder, generalized anxiety disorder, personality disorders, substance use disorders, and eating disorders.

There are currently no available drugs that treat dissociative symptoms directly; however, dissociative conditions appear to respond well to psychotherapy.

Evolution 

OSDD was officially adopted in the DSM-V, which was published in 2013, alongside Unspecified Dissociative Disorder to replace DDNOS.

Criteria 
There are currently four examples of OSDD given in the DSM. OSDD is a "catch-all" category for any presentation that is abnormal but does not meet the diagnostic criteria for any of the dissociative disorders, and therefore the examples given are not the only presentations of OSDD possible. OSDD is only diagnosed when it is known that another dissociative disorder is not present; if the diagnosis is still being clarified, or if there is not enough time to make an informed diagnosis (such as in an emergency room setting), a diagnosis of unspecified dissociative disorder may be given.

It is worth noting that a person will not be diagnosed with "OSDD type 4" (for example); instead they will simply be diagnosed with OSDD. The diagnosing clinician may specify in the client's file that the diagnosis is "OSDD (dissociative trance)", but in general the simple diagnosis of OSDD will be given.

OSDD type 1 
OSDD-1 is diagnosed when a person is experiencing sub-threshold dissociative identity disorder (DID).

The DSM states that "This category includes identity disturbance associated with less-than-marked discontinuities in sense of self and agency, or alterations of identity or episodes of possession in an individual who reports no dissociative amnesia".

The ICD-11 describes OSDD-1 as "Partial dissociative identity disorder".

OSDD type 2 
OSDD-2 describes a dissociative identity disturbance caused by "prolonged and intense coercive persuasion". The DSM gives the examples of "brainwashing, thought reform, indoctrination while captive, torture, long-term political imprisonment, recruitment by sects/cults or by terror organizations." People with OSDD-2, as a result, experience distressing changes to and/or questioning of their identity.

OSDD type 3 
OSDD-3 is diagnosed when a person experiences acute dissociative reactions to stressful events. These reactions last anywhere from a few hours to weeks, but typically less than a month. The dissociative conditions are characterised by "constriction of consciousness", including "depersonalization; derealization; perceptual disturbances (e.g., time slowing, macropsia); micro-amnesias; transient stupor; and/or alterations in sensory-motor functioning (e.g., analgesia, paralysis)."

OSDD type 4 
OSDD-4 is characterised by a dissociative trance; "an acute narrowing or complete loss of awareness of immediate surroundings that manifests as profound unresponsiveness or insensitivity to environmental stimuli." The DSM specifies that "The dissociative trance is not a normal part of a broadly accepted collective cultural or religious practice".

In the ICD-11, this condition warrants a separate diagnosis of Trance disorder.

See also 
 Dissociation
 Dissociative identity disorder
 International Classification of Diseases
 Personality

References

Dissociative disorders